The 2011–12 season of the Belgian Second Division (also known as EXQI League for sponsorship reasons) started in August 2011 and is the second tier football league in Belgium. The league is played by 18 teams, with 34 matchdays of 9 matches each, so each team plays the 17 other teams twice. The season is divided into 3 periods, the first period of 10 matches, the second of 12 matches and the third of 12 matches. Each period winner qualifies for the Belgian Second Division Final Round. On 14 April 2012, Charleroi became champions without playing as closest rivals Eupen and Oostende both did not manage to win their matches and thereby could no longer mathematically overtake Charleroi in the standings.

Team changes
After promotion and relegation, only 13 teams remained in the league, with 5 other being replaced:

Out
 Oud-Heverlee Leuven were promoted as champions of the previous season.
 Mons ended third, but won the second division final round and was therefore also promoted to the Pro League.
 Turnhout ended 16th, but lost the third division playoffs and was subsequently relegated.
 Rupel Boom was relegated to the Third Division after finishing 17th.
 Tournai was relegated to the Third Division after finishing 18th.

In
 Charleroi was directly relegated from the Pro League.
 Eupen lost the second division final round and as a result they were also relegated from the Pro League.
 Aalst promoted as champions from Third Division A.
 WS Woluwe promoted as champions from Third Division B.
 Sint-Niklaas was promoted after winning the third division playoffs.

Team information

Personnel and locations

Managerial changes

During summer break

During regular season

Regular season

League table

Period winners
The season is divided into three periods. The first ten matchdays together form the first period, matchdays 11 to 22 form period two and the last 12 form period three. The three period winners take part in the Belgian Second Division Final Round together with the winner of the 2011–12 Belgian Pro League relegation playoff. The winner of this final round gets to play in the 2012–13 Belgian Pro League. In case one or more periods are won by the team winning the league or in case one team wins multiple periods, the extra places go the teams finishing the highest in the league not already qualified. So in the theoretical case that one team wins all three periods and becomes the league champion, then the teams in positions 2, 3 and 4 will take part in the final round.

Period 1
Already after the first nine matches of the season, Eupen clinched the first period title.

Period 2

Period 3

Top goalscorers
Including matches played on 29 April 2012; Source:Soccerway

References

Belgian Second Division seasons
Belgian Second League
2